Carlos Watson (born September 29, 1969) is an American entrepreneur, journalist, and television host. A former contributor on MSNBC and anchor on CNN, he co-founded media company Ozy in 2013, and hosted several shows produced by the company.
As an entrepreneur, Watson co-founded Achieva College Prep Service in 2002, which he later sold to The Washington Post and Kaplan. During his tenure as CEO of Ozy, the company raised over $70 million from investors. Watson was the host of The Carlos Watson Show, a daily interview show on YouTube.

In September 2021, Watson attracted public controversy in the wake of a New York Times article alleging that Ozy had made significant misrepresentations to investors. Following the incident, Watson resigned from the board of NPR on October 1, 2021. Later that day, Ozy's board of directors announced that it was shutting the company down.  Watson, in an October 4 interview on Today, said that Ozy would remain in operation.

On February 23, 2023, Watson was arrested on fraud charges. Ozy shut down on March 1, 2023, as a result of charges against Watson and other executives.

Early life and education
Watson was born and raised in Miami, Florida, one of four siblings born to Jamaican parents. He was asked to leave kindergarten in 1974, but entered first grade the next year.

Watson graduated from Harvard University. He worked as Chief of Staff and Campaign Manager for Florida Representative Daryl Jones, and managed Bill Clinton’s 1992 Election Day effort in Miami-Dade County, Florida. He subsequently attended Stanford Law School, where he was an editor of the Stanford Law Review and president of the Stanford Law School Student Government.

Career

Business career 
After graduating from Stanford Law School in 1995, Watson began work at McKinsey & Company. After two years at McKinsey, Watson left to co-found Achieva College Prep Service based in San Mateo, California. Watson sold Achieva in 2002 to competitor Kaplan, Inc. He later worked as the Global Head of Education Investment Banking for Goldman Sachs.

In 1997, he was a co-founder, together with Laurene Powell Jobs, of College Track.

Journalism and television career 
Watson began a television career in 2002 with guest appearances on Fox News and Court TV as a political analyst. He joined CNBC in early 2003 and moved to CNN later that year.

For two years, he appeared regularly as a political commentator on CNN, most notably covering the 2004 presidential election and writing CNN.com's main political column. Watson also hosted Meet the Faith on BET.

In 2007, Watson began hosting a series of one-hour primetime interview specials on Hearst Television stations across the country called Conversations with Carlos Watson, which won a Gracie Allen award for "Outstanding Portrait/Biography Program" and an Accolade Award in 2008.

Watson was named one of Peoples "Hottest Bachelors" in 2004, as well as Extras list of most eligible bachelors in 2008.

Watson was a founder and investor in The Stimulist, a daily blog that operated from mid-to-late 2009.

Watson was became a daytime news anchor for MSNBC in March 2009. From June to September 2009, he hosted an 11:00 am newscast on the channel.

In March 2016, PBS announced a new debate program, Point Taken, produced and hosted by Watson.

Watson was elected to the Board of Directors of NPR in 2018.  On September 17, 2021, NPR announced that he was reelected to a second three-year term that would begin on November 1. In the wake of allegations that he committed fraud in his role as CEO of Ozy Media, Watson resigned from the NPR board on October 1.

Watson was an executive producer for Black Women OWN the Conversation for the Oprah Winfrey Network. The episode "Motherhood" won the Outstanding News Discussion and Analysis award at the 41st News & Documentary Emmy Awards in 2020. He had been booked to present the documentary awards at the 2021 awards show, but stepped down following the New York Times report about Ozy.

Ozy 
In September 2013, Watson launched Ozy, a daily digital news and culture magazine, with Samir Rao, a fellow Goldman Sachs alumnus.

As CEO, Watson led Ozy to raise over $70 million in fundraising from investors including Laurene Powell Jobs, Louise Rogers, Ron Conway, and others. The publication expanded from a daily digital news publisher to a producer of TV shows and podcasts. Ozy had partnerships with A&E Networks, iHeart Media, and Live Nation.

Watson was also the host of several of Ozy's TV shows and the Ozy Fest events held in New York City.

In late September 2021, Ozy Media was the subject of a New York Times article bringing attention to possibly fraudulent business practices and misrepresentations, including some attributed to Watson. Watson sent an email to all Ozy staff, and posted it to his Twitter account, referring to the Times article as a "ridiculous hitjob". Five former Ozy employees reported that, as a New York article summarized, "Watson's demands, expectations, and plans were often detached from reality, yet were enforced with an intensity that some felt bordered on cruelty."

Sharon Osbourne, the wife of rock star Ozzy Osbourne, alleged that Watson had falsely claimed the couple had invested in the business. She said of Watson, "This guy is the biggest shyster I have ever seen in my life". Watson told NBC News's Today that he had referred to the Osbournes as investors because they received shares of Ozy stock as part of a legal settlement. Osbourne told CNBC that she was repeatedly offered shares in Ozy and declined all offers.

On October 1, 2021, Ozy announced that it would cease operations. Watson on October 4 said that the company would remain in business.

On February 8, 2023, Ozy held a 30-minute upfront presentation in New York, promoting itself to advertisers. Watson appeared at the presentation to host a live version of his eponymous talk show.

Ozy announced that it was shutting down on March 1, 2023, following federal fraud charges against Watson and other executives.

Arrest and charges

On February 23, 2023, Watson was arrested on fraud charges. The arrest occurred shortly after Samir Rao, the co-founder and ex-chief operating officer of Ozy Media, pled guilty to fraud charges. In a court document dated February 22, prosecutors for the Eastern District of New York said that Watson had "engaged in a scheme to defraud Ozy’s potential investors, potential acquirers, lenders and potential lenders" by misreporting Ozy's financial results and audience metrics. Watson pleaded not guilty to the charges.

On his Twitter account on February 24, Watson denied wrongdoing, writing, "I am not now and never have been a 'con man.'" Watson defended his work and vowed to fight the charges “with everything I have”.

References

External links
 Carlos Watson - Profile on ozy.com
 
 From Silicon Valley to CNN, cover story in Stanford Lawyer, Winter 2006

1969 births
African-American businesspeople
African-American journalists
African-American television hosts
American bloggers
American online publication editors
American television reporters and correspondents
Businesspeople from Miami
Detroit Free Press people
Florida lawyers
Harvard University alumni
Living people
Miami Herald people
MSNBC people
Stanford Law School alumni
21st-century American non-fiction writers
McKinsey & Company people
21st-century American journalists
20th-century American businesspeople
21st-century American businesspeople
21st-century American male writers
American male journalists
American male bloggers
American writers of Jamaican descent